On 27 March 2022, 20 people were killed in a mass shooting in Las Tinajas, Zinapécuaro, Michoacán, Mexico.

Background

The Mexican drug war is a low-intensity conflict which began in 2006. Michoacán, in western Mexico, is badly affected by the conflict. Several massacres have occurred there, including a mass shooting on 27 February 2022 in San José de Gracia. Rival gangs in the area are also involved in smuggling of gasoline and in illegal tapping of pipelines.

Incident
During the evening of 27 March 2022, gunmen armed with machine guns and assault rifles opened fire at an illegal cockfighting pit and shot dead 17 men and three women. Several other people were wounded. One person later died on their way to the hospital. The massacre was believed to be part of a conflict between the Jalisco New Generation Cartel and a local gang called the Familia Michoacana.

Aftermath
On 1 April 2022, five men were arrested in Susupuato in connection with the massacre. They were also linked to a February 2022 attack on a prosecutor's office in Maravatío.

References

2022 mass shootings in Mexico
2022 murders in Mexico
21st century in Michoacán
21st-century mass murder in Mexico
Cockfighting
Crime in Michoacán
March 2022 crimes in North America
March 2022 events in Mexico
Massacres in 2022
Massacres in Mexico
Organized crime events in Mexico
Violent non-state actor incidents in Mexico